Domingo Antonio Velasco was an Italian painter. He was best known for his portrait of composer Domenico Scarlatti, which commemorates the musician's initiation into the Order of Santiago on 21 April 1738 by King John V of Portugal.

References

18th-century Italian painters
Italian male painters
Year of death missing
Year of birth missing
18th-century Italian male artists